Adam Casey (born 1 May 1986 in Sydney, Australia) is an Australian footballer who used to play for Tuggeranong United in the National Premier Leagues. But now plays for Oak Flats Falcons and played for Sydney FC, New Zealand Knights, North Queensland Fury in the Hyundai a-league, and represented Australia with the u17 Joey's and u23 Olyroos.

Club career
Born in Sydney, Adam grew up in Canberra and Townsville joining the ACT Academy of Sport program before progressing in 2003 to a place in the Australian Institute of Sport program. On completion of his AIS scholarship, he joined ACT Premier League club O'Connor Knights for the 2004 winter season and as the NSL had wound up removing any national level opportunities, he played at Belconnen Blue Devils for the NSWPL 2004/05 season.  The following summer, with Belconnen outed from the competition, Casey moved to Wollongong Wolves for a brief spell before being signed to New Zealand Knights in April 2006.

Adam came on as a second-half substitute in the Knights opening game of 2006–07.  In total, he made eight appearances for the club throughout the season although was unable to find the net, a not uncommon problem for Knights players with only eleven goals scored across the team in a disappointing season.

Sydney FC
On 30 January 2007, Casey signed a two-year deal with Sydney FC. He played in four matches in Sydney's AFC Champions League 2007 campaign and also made his mark on the scoresheet in a friendly against Marconi Stallions. He signed on another two-year deal under John Kosmina after Branko Culina being let go by the club. Vitezlav Lavicka took the role and he followed up playing six matches during the A-League season and scoring once. Casey agreed to be released 1 year early off his contract and was signed by North Queensland Fury.

North Queensland Fury
Casey made his debut for the Townsville club in their Round 1, 3–3 draw with Perth Glory.

Dandaloo FC
With the demise, and eventual folding of North Queensland Fury due to financial reasons, Casey ended up signing for Illawarra Premier League club Dandaloo FC, joining former A-League players Alvin Ceccoli and Noel Spencer.

Dandenong Thunder SC
Adam signed with Dandenong Thunder from the Victorian Premier League in 2012.

Adam signed with the Rockdale City Suns for the 2013 NSWPL season, joining his former Sydney FC coach Branco Culina at the club.

International career
While at the AIS, he was establishing a place in the Australian U17 squad, scoring six goals in the Joey's 2003 FIFA U-17 World Championship qualification campaign.

Casey was included in the Olyroos squad for a tournament in Vietnam in 2006.  He was recalled into the side in May 2007 for 2008 Summer Olympics qualification matches, making an appearance against Jordan.

Honours
With Sydney FC:
  A-League Premiership: 2009–2010
  A-League Championship: 2009–2010

References

External links
 North Queensland Fury profile
 FFA – Olyroo profile
 Oz Football profile

1986 births
Living people
Sportsmen from New South Wales
Australia youth international soccer players
New Zealand Knights FC players
Sydney FC players
Northern Fury FC players
A-League Men players
Expatriate association footballers in New Zealand
National Premier Leagues players
Soccer players from Sydney
Association football wingers
Australian soccer players